Kati-Claudia Fofonoff (8 December 1947 in Ivalo – 12 June 2011) was a Skolt Saami author and translator who wrote in Skolt Saami and Finnish. Her books have also been translated into Northern Saami, Norwegian and Icelandic.

Works
 Parnasso 2 1982 (Poems in Finnish)
 Koparat: joulukoparat 1987 (Poems in Finnish)
 Paatsjoen laulut - Pââšjooǥǥ laulli 1988-1989 (book and cassette)
 Jânnam muttum nuuʹbbiooʹri 1998 (Poems in Skolt Saami)
 Vuämm Jeeʹelvueiʹvv. Mainnâz. 2004
 Vanha jäkäläpää 1–2 2005 (CD)
 Suonikylän poluilta 1–3 2005 (CD)

Translations
 Antoine de Saint-Exupéry: Uʹcc priinsâž 2000 (The Little Prince in Skolt Saami)

References

External links
 Kati-Claudia Fofonoff 
 U'cc priinsâž, The Little Prince in Skolt Saami
 Kati-Claudia Fofonoff has died 

1947 births
2011 deaths
Finnish Sámi people
People from Inari, Finland
Finnish Sámi-language writers
20th-century Finnish poets
Skolts
Finnish women poets
20th-century Finnish women writers